Martina Piemonte (born 7 November 1997) is an Italian professional footballer who plays as a striker for Serie A club AC Milan and the Italy women's national team.

Piemonte formerly played for her hometown club Riviera di Romagna. and for San Zaccaria.

Club career
Piemonte was considered a prodigy in Italian women's football. She signed a professional contract with Riviera di Romagna in 2012 at the age of 14, before leaving for San Zaccaria following the 2014 FIFA U-17 Women's World Cup.

On 15 July 2016, Piemonte joined AGSM Verona from San Zaccaria. In July 2017, she signed for Sevilla F.C. women, to play in the Spanish La Liga.

International career
Piemonte was a member of the Italian women's U-17 squad and played at the 2014 FIFA U-17 Women's World Cup, in which her country finished in third place.

References

External links
 Profile at A.S. Roma

1997 births
Living people
Women's association football forwards
Italian women's footballers
Sportspeople from Ravenna
Italy women's international footballers
Serie A (women's football) players
A.S.D. AGSM Verona F.C. players
A.S. Roma (women) players
Primera División (women) players
Sevilla FC (women) players
Real Betis Féminas players
Italian expatriate women's footballers
Italian expatriate sportspeople in Spain
Expatriate women's footballers in Spain
Fiorentina Women's F.C. players
Footballers from Emilia-Romagna
UEFA Women's Euro 2022 players
A.C. Milan Women players